The 1984 President's Cup Football Tournament was the 14th competition of Korea Cup. The competition was held from 30 May to 8 June 1984, and was won by a Brazilian club Bangu for the first time, who defeated Hallelujah FC in the final. It attracted a total of 146,000 spectators.

Group stage

Group A

Group B

Knockout stage

Bracket

Semi-finals

Third place play-off

Final

See also
Korea Cup
South Korea national football team results

References

External links
President's Cup 1984 (South Korea) at RSSSF

1984